Aeschynanthus acuminatus is an Asian species of vine plants in the family Gesneriaceae, with no subspecies listed in the Catalogue of Life.  A common name for this and similar species in the genus "lipstick vine".

References

External links 

Flora of Indo-China
acuminatus